Orlando Salido vs. Vasiliy Lomachenko, was a boxing bout for the WBO world title. The bout was held on March 1, 2014, in San Antonio, Texas, United States. The fight was televised live on HBO World Championship Boxing.

Had Lomachenko won the bout, he would have broken the record set by Thailand's Saensak Muangsurin, who won a junior welterweight world title in his third pro fight in 1975.

Lomachenko lost a controversial split decision to a fighter that failed to make weight (and thereby vacated his belt) who weighed, post weigh-in, 147 lbs., 21 pounds over the fight limit.  Two judges had it for Salido, 116–112 and 115–113, while the third had it for Lomachenko 115–113. ESPN.com had it 114–114. Lomachenko, for his part, stated he felt the decision was "fair" and accepted blame for not following through with his corner's game plan, promising to learn from the experience and come back stronger.

Lomachenko went on to tie the record for fewest bouts to a professional championship two months later, besting undefeated Gary Russell, Jr. for the WBO featherweight belt in his next match, on June 11, 2014.

Background 
Lomachenko is a Ukrainian professional boxer who became two-time Olympic gold medalist and a winner of gold medals at the 2009 World Amateur Boxing Championships and 2011 World Amateur Boxing Championships. At the 2008 Beijing Olympic Games he was awarded the Val Barker Trophy.

Lomachenko is being regarded as one of the best amateur fighters of all time.

Lomachenko wanted to fight for a world title in his pro debut, but that was not possible.

Salido's weight issues
Salido, 33, of Mexico, failed to make weight and was stripped of his belt at the weigh-in. He was 128¼ pounds, well over the 126-pound limit. And he weighed 11 pounds more than Lomachenko at the start of the contest.

Boxing Insider, "Salido showed up heavy for the fight. Really heavy. One hundred forty-seven pounds heavy."

Bad Left Hook: "A few things worked against him [Lomachenko]. Orlando Salido not making the fight's weight limit of 126 pounds and then rehydrating up to 147, compared to Lomachenko's 136."

Criticisms of referee and Orlando Salido
In addition to criticizism of low blows by Salido, the referee of the fight, Laurence Cole, was roundly criticized by many boxing media-outlets for his perceived failure to properly conduct the match:

ESPN wrote, "Cole warned him only once and did not seem too concerned" regarding low blows.
In an interview with The Ring Magazine, Laurence admitted that his performance in the fight "might not have been his 'A-game." and they noted "Cole came under fire for appearing to allow Salido to land an inordinate amount of low blows."
Boxing Insider wrote, "Of course Salido didn't exactly win the fight fair and square. The guy was about as dirty as they come on Saturday. He hit low and hit low consistently. Referee Laurence Cole didn't seem to notice, or to much care, so Salido whacked Lomachenko below the beltline throughout the entire bout..."
Boxing.com wrote, "Few referees have turned in a performance as bad as that which Laurence Cole blessed us with Saturday night in, inevitably, San Antonio, Texas" and "astonishingly bad performance" in its article. They have claimed that the referee Laurence Cole failed to enforce rules on clinching, pushing and blows below the belt. The site has also mentioned: "not only should this ridiculous excuse for a referee be sacked forthwith but the role of his father plays in allegedly consistently obtaining for him some of the biggest fights in Texas in his role with the Texan commission needs to be investigated."
Yahoo! Sports wrote that the fight was "poorly officiated by referee Laurence Cole, who missed numerous fouls and seemed to let anything go."
Bad Left Hook wrote, "Maligned Texas referee Laurence Cole's performance was roundly and rightly criticized for missing a metric ton of Salido's low blows, which landed on the thighs and hips mainly. And that mattered."
The Sweet Science wrote, "Holding and hitting, hitting on the break, low blows galore... Salido was aided by ref Laurence Cole who left his glasses at home."

This was the latest in many controversies surrounding Cole, whose father Dickie Cole is the long time boxing commissioner of Texas.

Response
According to Boxing Insider, "Seriously, the guy had one fight – just one fight – to his name when he got a crack at the WBO Featherweight title. It was unheard of. It was beyond unheard of. In fact, it was literally a first." thus the attempt still being a record of its own.

Many boxing magazines mentioned that the referee allowed Salido to deliver an inordinate number of low blows. Salido was also criticized for failing to make weight and some sources stipulated that he did so intentionally, as well as coming back much heavier than Lomachenko on the fight night.

References

Boxing matches
2014 in boxing
Boxing in Texas
2014 in sports in Texas
Sports competitions in San Antonio
March 2014 sports events in the United States